Reginald Lee "Reggie" McElroy (born March 4, 1960) is a former National Football League (NFL) offensive lineman from 1982 through 1996.

Now works as a head coach for the Blue Valley Northwest Huskies in Overland Park, Kansas.

He is the older brother of former running back and kick returner, Leeland McElroy, who played for the Arizona Cardinals.

References

External links

1960 births
Living people
People from Beaumont, Texas
American football offensive tackles
West Texas A&M Buffaloes football players
New York Jets players
Los Angeles Raiders players
Kansas City Chiefs players
Minnesota Vikings players
Denver Broncos players
Scottish Claymores coaches
Berlin Thunder coaches